Chote Chaba (also written Tsultrim Dakpa) (died 1934) was a Tibetan lama, the 12th incarnation of the Migyur Khutughtu, and the 18th king of Muli. At the time, Muli was a small princely state on the border between Tibetan and Han Chinese civilisation; it now forms the Muli Tibetan Autonomous County in southwestern Sichuan province.

The title of khutughtu, which is the Mongolian term for a reincarnate lama was granted to Chote Chamba's predecessor, the 10th Migyur, by the Qianlong Emperor of Qing China in 1751. The 10th Migyur also received the title of Nomun Khan.

Joseph Rock, an Austrian-American botanist, travelled to Muli in the 1930s and befriended Chote Chamba. Rock stated in his diary, which is now collected in the Harvard University library, Chote Chamba was murdered in September, 1934.

Chote Chamba's reincarnation, the 13th Migyur Khutughtu, was born in Lithang in year on July 4, 1935. He was recognized by Ngawang Legpa Rinpoche at the age of one, and was given the name Ngawang Tenzin Migyur.

Tibetan kings
1934 deaths
Year of birth missing
20th-century murdered monarchs